Saltash United Football Club is an English football club based in Saltash, Cornwall.

Since its formation in 1946, the club has won three Western Football League Premier Division titles, one Western Football League Division One title and two South Western League titles.

The club crest adopts the heraldic seal used by the town of Saltash for many centuries. The shield is placed between two ostrich feathers and ensigned by a crown, which are taken from the arms of the Duchy of Cornwall.

History

Foundation, formation and the early years
Football in Saltash was played as long ago as the 1890s under the name of Essa, although the date of its formation and origin remain unclear. The team eventually became known as Saltash Stars and had a credible history which included a hat-trick of victories in the Cornwall Senior Cup, winning the trophy in the seasons 1929–32. They disbanded for the duration of the Second World War but reformed in the 1946–47 season, this time under the name of Saltash United.

In 1951, the club won the Cornwall Senior Cup, for the first time since 1932 – alongside the Charity Cup and Herald Cup – to complete the "Triple Crown" taking all three Cornish senior trophies. The club entered the South Western Football League in 1951–52 as a founder member, finishing runners up and winning the inaugural South Western League Cup by defeating a strong Torquay United reserves side 3–2. The Ashes went on the secure the South Western League title in the 1953–54 season before the club was forced to disband and withdrew in 1958. However, a group of enthusiasts led by long serving club supporter Terry Maynard, called an Extraordinary General Meeting on 22 July 1959, and Saltash United was unanimously reformed. At the same time, a small committee was formed to raise funds over the next 12 months to set the club back on its feet. The 1960–61 season saw the club join the newly formed East Cornwall League.

Former player Alan Armstrong was appointed team manager for the 1969–70 season and lifted the South Western League Cup. The following season, David Lean left Plymouth Argyle to become player-manager of Saltash United.

Western League years (1976–95)
The club entered and won the 1976–77 Western League Division One at their first attempt. Peter Darke guided the club to a 4th-place finish in the club's first season in the Western League Premier Division. Despite a 3rd-place finish in 1978–79, the club was back in 9th place the following season.

Following a 2nd-place finish in the 1983–84 season, the club won its first Western League Premier Division title in 1984–85. Saltash United won the league again in the 1986–87 and 1988–89 seasons. The 1987–88 season saw the club's best FA Cup run to date. The run started with a 3-0 win at league opponents Taunton Town F.C. in the 1st qualifying round. This was followed up by a 7-1 thrashing of Ottery St Mary A.F.C. of the lower Western League Division One, and then a 3-0 home win over Tiverton Town F.C. of the same lower division. The club fell one round short of reaching the FA Cup First Round Proper, losing 4–2 away to Isthmian League side Farnborough F.C. in the Fourth Qualifying Round.

South Western League (1995–2007)
By the end of the 1994–95 season the club returned to the South Western League as the high travelling expense of competing in the Western League took its toll.
League success eluded the club in the ensuing years, with only the Durning Lawrence Charity Cup, won in 2000–01 to show for their efforts.

Allan Evans became team manager in 2002 and his influence was immediately felt with new players and a new approach to club discipline and training. 
Despite rejoining the Western League First Division for two seasons in 2004–05 and 2005–06, the club once again returned to the South Western League, with a 3rd-place finish.

South West Peninsula League (2007–2021)
The 2007–08 season saw the club join the newly formed South West Peninsula League finishing the inaugural season as runners-up. On 29 May 2013, Saltash announced Martin Burgess as team manager, succeeding Stuart Dudley who resigned at the end of the 2012–13 season. On 21 January 2015, Burgess stepped down as team manager with the Ashes only a point behind the league leaders citing player priorities and squad availability as the reasons for his resignation.

The 2015–16 season saw Matthew Cusack appointed team manager alongside assistant Dane Bunney, both former Saltash players. Despite starting with only 8 registered players, they guided the Ashes to a sixth-place finish. The Ashes started the 2016–17 season strongly under Cusack with the club breaking their record for most consecutive wins at the start of a season, beating St Blazey 5–0 on 27 August 2016. The following season, 2017–18, Saltash lifted the Cornwall Senior Cup for the first time in 25 years, having lost on their last five Senior Cup final appearances.

Bunney was appointed team manager following Cusack's resignation in March 2020 to join Plymouth Parkway as head coach. Bunney guided the club to its longest FA Cup run since the 1991–92 season and were joint top of the Peninsula League Premier West table when the season was curtailed. In 2021 they were promoted to the Premier Division of the Western League based on their results in the abandoned 2019–20 and 2020–21 seasons.

Stadium

Saltash United play their home games at The Waterways Stadium, Callington Road, Saltash, Cornwall, PL12 6DX. The ground's official name was Kimberley Stadium until March 2022 when it was renamed through a sponsorship deal. The ground is floodlit with a covered seated stand and licensed clubhouse.

Saltash United moved to Kimberley Stadium in the 1951–52 season and new dressing rooms and covered accommodation was opened on 21 April 1969 when a full Plymouth Argyle first team beat Saltash United 7–0 in the commemorative match.

The main grandstand was named the Tim Halford Stand on 12 July 2008. Halford was the club's manager when he died in September 2007 at the age of 45.

Honours
Saltash United's list of honours include the following.

Records

 Best FA Cup performance: FA Cup Fourth Round Qualifying (1987–88)
 Best FA Trophy performance: First Round (1985–86, 1986–87)
 Best FA Vase performance: Third Round (1996–97, 2013–14, 2018–19)
 Most League goals in a season (by team): 127 (1974–75, South Western League, 36 games)
 Most League points in a season: 90 (2016–17, South West Peninsula League Premier Division, 38 games)

Players

Current squad

Notable former players
This list of former players includes those who received international caps while playing for the team, made significant contributions to the team in terms of appearances or goals while playing for the team, or who made significant contributions to the sport either before they played for the team, or after they left. It is clearly not yet complete and all inclusive, and additions and refinements will continue to be made over time.

 Paul Adcock
 Derek Bellotti
 John Brimacombe
 Adrian Burrows
 Roy Carter
 Steve Davey
 Chris Harrison
 Russell Musker
 Kevin Parker
 Lee Phillips
 Michael Preston
 Paul Price
 Mike Reeves
 Derek Rickard
 Alan Rogers
 Jon Sheffield
 John Sims
 Steve Thompson

Club officials

Committee members

Coaching positions
First Team

Managerial history
Updated as of 16 December 2022.  Only managers since joining the South West Peninsula League are shown.

 2006  Tim Halford
 2007  Kevin Hendy
 2012  Kevin Hendy  Stuart Dudley
 2013  Stuart Dudley
 2013  Martin Burgess

 2015  Phil Bayliss
 2015  Matt Cusack
 2020  Dane Bunney
 2022  Danny Lewis  Shane Krac
 2022  Danny Lewis

Sponsorship
The club's current sportswear manufacturer is Kappa. The club's main sponsor is Waterways Drainage Specialists Ltd.

References

External links
 Official Club website

 Cornwall Senior Cup Saltash Record

Football clubs in Cornwall
Football clubs in England
Association football clubs established in 1946
South West Peninsula League
1946 establishments in England
Western Football League